Afro Medusa is a British dance music trio, consisting of the vocalist Isabel Fructuoso, Nick Bennett and Patrick Cole. They placed two songs on the US Hot Dance Music/Club Play chart, beginning with "Pasilda", which hit No. 1 in 2000. In 2002, they climbed to No. 26 with "Dreams" and, in 2008, they released "Oracle" with Cherie as vocalist.

"Pasilda" also reached number 31 in the UK Singles Chart in October 2000.

See also
List of Number 1 Dance Hits (United States)
List of artists who reached number one on the US Dance chart

References

External links
Afro Medusa official homepage
Isabel Fructuoso

British dance music groups
British electronic musicians